The North and South Open was one of the most prestigious professional golf tournaments in the United States in the first half of the twentieth century. It was played at Pinehurst Resort in North Carolina, long the largest golf resort in the world, which also staged a series of other tournaments with the "North and South" name, some of which continue to this day.

The event ran from 1902 to 1951 and was won by many major champions, including three-time winners Walter Hagen, Ben Hogan, and Sam Snead. Played in March until 1944, the final seven events were held in early November. Hogan's win in 1940 at age 27 was his first as a professional; the winner's share was a thousand dollars.

It was cancelled when the professionals asked the patrician patriarch of Pinehurst, Richard Tufts, who was a great champion of amateurism, to increase the prize money in line with PGA Tour rates. The final tourney's purse was $7,500 in 1951, with a winner's share of $1,500. The Ryder Cup was held at the course the previous week, but only five of the nine on the winning U.S. team stayed to play.

Winners
1902 Alec Ross
1903 Donald Ross
1904 Alec Ross (2) 
1905 Donald Ross (2)
1906 Donald Ross (3)
1907 Alec Ross (3)
1908 Alec Ross (4)
1909 Fred McLeod
1910 Alec Ross (5)
1911 Gilbert Nicholls
1912 Tom McNamara (1)
1913 Tom McNamara (2)
1914 Gilbert Nicholls (2)
1915 Alec Ross (6)
1916 Jim Barnes
1917 Mike Brady
1918 Walter Hagen
1919 Jim Barnes (2)
1920 Fred McLeod
1921 Jock Hutchison
1922 Pat O'Hara
1923 Walter Hagen (2)
1924 Walter Hagen (3)
1925 Macdonald Smith
1926 Bobby Cruickshank
1927 Bobby Cruickshank (2)
1928 Billy Burke
1929 Horton Smith
1930 Paul Runyan
1931 Wiffy Cox
1932 Johnny Golden
1933 Joe Kirkwood, Sr.
1934 Henry Picard
1935 Paul Runyan (2)
1936 Henry Picard (2)
1937 Horton Smith (2)
1938 Vic Ghezzi
1939 Byron Nelson
1940 Ben Hogan
1941 Sam Snead
1942 Ben Hogan (2)
1943 Bobby Cruickshank (3) - event limited to players 38 and older and members of the armed services
1944 Bob Hamilton
1945 Cary Middlecoff - as an amateur
1946 Ben Hogan (3)
1947 Jim Turnesa
1948 Toney Penna
1949 Sam Snead (2)
1950 Sam Snead (3)
1951 Tommy Bolt

See also
North and South Men's Amateur Golf Championship
North and South Women's Amateur Golf Championship

References

External links
GolfWeb.com article on Pinehurst (cached at google.com)
Golf Compendium: North and South Open

Former PGA Tour events
Golf in North Carolina
1902 establishments in North Carolina
1951 disestablishments in North Carolina
Recurring sporting events established in 1902
Recurring sporting events disestablished in 1951